Songs from the Front Lawn is the debut album of New Zealand musical/theatrical duo The Front Lawn, released on 9 August 1989.

Track listing

Personnel 

 Don McGlashan – guitars, vocals, drums
 Harry Sinclair – concertina, vocals
Jennifer Ward-Lealand – backing vocals, ukulele
 David Long - guitars
 Janet Roddick - backing vocals, trombone, organ, percussion
 Steve Roche - trumpet, marimba, percussion
 Anthony Donaldson - drums, washboard, percussion
 Neill Duncan - saxophones, percussion
 David Donaldson - double bass, electric bass

Charts

References

1989 debut albums
The Front Lawn albums